Eta Crucis (η Crucis) is a solitary star in the southern constellation of Crux. It can be seen with the naked eye, having an apparent visual magnitude of 4.14m. Based upon parallax measurements, η Crucis is located  64 light-years from the Sun. The system made its closest approach about 1.6 million years ago when it achieved perihelion at a distance of roughly 26 light years.

This is an F-type main sequence star with a stellar classification of F2 V. It has 130% of the Sun's radius and shines with 7 times the luminosity of the Sun from an outer atmosphere with an effective temperature of 6,964 K. Observations of the system using the Spitzer Space Telescope show a statistically significant infrared excess of emission at a wavelength of 70μm. This suggests the presence of a circumstellar disk. The temperature of this material is below 70 K.

Eta Crucis has a pair of visual companions. Component B is a magnitude 11.80 star located at an angular separation of 48.30″ along a position angle of 300°, as of 2010. Component C has a magnitude of 12.16 and lies at an angular separation of 35.50″ along a position angle of 194°, as of 2000.

References

External links

Crucis, Eta
Crux (constellation)
F-type main-sequence stars
105211
059072
4616
Durchmusterung objects
Gliese and GJ objects